Miss Baker (1957 – November 29, 1984) was a squirrel monkey who in 1959 became, along with female rhesus macaque Able, one of the first two animals launched into space by the United States who safely returned.

Previous animal flights

Previous United States efforts at launching monkeys to space had met with the animals' demise from suffocation or parachute failure, although Soviet Union efforts had fared a little better, to the chagrin of animal rights activists. Albert II became the first monkey and first mammal in space, launched on a V-2 rocket on June 14, 1949. The United States had also flown monkeys and mice by Aerobee rocket to heights below the edge of space beginning in 1951.

Pre-flight 
The squirrel monkey who was to become known as Miss Baker was purchased along with 25 other squirrel monkeys at a pet shop in Miami, Florida, and brought to the Naval Aviation Medical School in Pensacola. Fourteen of the candidates tolerated confinement for periods up to 24 hours, electrodes all over their bodies, and monitoring at all hours. Miss Baker "stood out from the rest because of her intelligence and loving, docile manner", relayed Colin Burgess and Chris Dubbs in their 2007 book Animals In Space: From Research Rockets to the Space Shuttle. For this, and her apparent pleasure at being handled with tender loving care, she earned the nickname TLC.

With experiments imminent, the Army named their monkey "Alpha," and the Navy followed with "Bravo," names taken directly from the phonetic alphabet. Before flight, though, the names changed to the first letters of the antiquated Joint Army/Navy Phonetic Alphabet.

The flight 

Miss Baker wore a helmet lined with rubber and chamois leather plus a jacket for launch, in addition to a respiration meter affixed to her nose with model cement, and she was fitted into a snug capsule of shoebox size, 9¾ × 12½ × 6¾ inches (24.8 × 31.8 × 17.1 cm) insulated with rubber and fiberglass. Life support was an oxygen bottle with a pressure valve, and lithium hydroxide to absorb exhaled carbon dioxide and moisture.

On May 28, 1959, at 2:39 a.m., a Jupiter rocket lifted Miss Baker and Miss Able to an altitude of  through an acceleration of 38 gs for a 16-minute flight which also included 9 minutes of weightlessness. The flight traveled  downrange from the pad at Cape Canaveral launch complex 26B to the Atlantic Ocean near Puerto Rico where the capsule was recovered by USS Kiowa.

The following table shows some characteristics of the monkeys on Jupiter AM-18 and the measurements taken during flight. Some of Able's measurements had data problems as indicated.

Able and Baker were not alone on the flight. They were accompanied by Neurospora; samples of human blood; E. coli; onions; mustard and corn seeds; Drosophila pupae; yeast; and sea urchin eggs and sperm.

Able died four days after the flight from a highly unusual cardiac fibrillation in reaction to anesthesia to remove electrodes. "This is the type of anesthetic death every surgeon fears," said Colonel Robert Hullinghorst, deputy at Ft. Knox where the surgery took place, "We don't know exactly why it occurs." An autopsy found no problems that may have contributed to her death. Able is stuffed and on display at the National Air and Space Museum.

Post-flight 

Owing to their successful return from space and safe recovery by the USS Kiowa (ATF-72) and their crew, Able and Baker appeared on the cover of Life magazine, June 15, 1959.

In 1962, Pensacola caretakers held a marriage ceremony to wed Miss Baker to Big George.

Miss Baker lived at the Naval Aerospace Medical Center in Pensacola, Florida until 1971.

In 1971, Miss Baker moved to the U.S. Space & Rocket Center in Huntsville, Alabama, where she entertained museum visitors and drew 100–150 letters a day from schoolchildren. The 1977 birthday celebrations brought balloons, camera flashes, and the regular fare of cottage cheese for Miss Baker and Big George.

Big George predeceased Miss Baker on January 8, 1979, and three months later, Norman, from the Yerkes National Primate Research Center, became her second mate in a ceremony presided over by Alabama District Court judge Dan McCoy. Miss Baker refused to wear her white wedding train for the event, tearing it off after a few seconds.

In 1982, center director Ed Buckbee said, "Baker delights visitors every day with her energy and antics with her husband Norman." Her birthday was celebrated within a few weeks of the actual day, on the anniversary of her flight, May 28 each year.

In celebration of the 25th anniversary of her spaceflight, Baker was treated to a rubber duck and, her favorite, strawberry gelatin with bananas, along with well-wishes from thousands of people.

In 1984, Miss Baker died of kidney failure at a clinic at Auburn University after attaining the record for oldest living squirrel monkey. She is buried on the grounds at the U.S. Space & Rocket Center. Her tombstone routinely has one or more bananas on top.

See also
 List of individual monkeys

References

U.S. Space & Rocket Center
Animals in space
Individual monkeys
1957 animal births
1984 animal deaths
Deaths from kidney failure
Individual primates in the United States
Female mammals